Colleen et les Boîtes à Musique is a 14-track EP by French electronica artist Colleen (real name Cécile Schott) released on October 2, 2006. It was recorded between 2004 and January 2006 for the atelier de création radiophonique of France Culture, a national radio station, to be played back in a special broadcast. Schott was pleased with the results and soon decided to also release the recordings as an EP. This EP became her second release of 2006, acting as successor to the Mort Aux Vaches live album released in January.

Thirteen of the fourteen tracks were made entirely using music boxes, accounting for the EP's name which translates into English as "Colleen and the Music Boxes". The exception was track 14, "I'll Read You a Story", which also included classical guitar and could be found on the 2005 album The Golden Morning Breaks. The enhanced CD also included a video for this track.

Track listing
All songs were composed and played by Cécile Schott.

"John Levers the Ratchet" – 0:30
"What is a Componium?" (Part 1) – 6:44
"Charles's Birthday Card" – 0:47
"Will You Gamelan for Me?" – 3:01
"The Sad Panther" – 1:52
"Under the Roof" – 3:09
"What is a Componium?" (Part 2) – 3:05
"A Bear is Trapped" – 1:04
"Please Gamelan Again" – 2:30
"Your Heart is so Loud" – 3:56
"Calypso in a Box" – 0:47
"Bicycle Bells" – 2:28
"Happiness Nuggets" – 2:13
"I'll Read You a Story" – 6:49 – A video is also included on the enhanced CD.

Credits

Instrumentation
 Cécile Schott – music box (tracks 1-14) and classical guitar (track 14).

Production credits
 Composed by Cécile Schott
 Produced by Cécile Schott
 Recorded by John Cavanagh (tracks 1, 3-4, 6, 8-9, 11-13) and Cécile Schott (all other tracks)
 Mastering by Emiliano Flores
 Artwork by Iker Spozio

References

External links
 Official Leaf Label page for the album
 Page featuring video for "I'll Read You a Story"
 Wholphin Volume 2 also features "I'll Read You a Story", on the film "Born Like Stars"
 
 

Colleen (musician) EPs
2006 EPs
The Leaf Label albums